The Last of the Street Survivors Farewell Tour is a concert tour by American Southern rock band Lynyrd Skynyrd. It was originally intended to be the final tour conducted by the band. It began May 4, 2018, at the Coral Sky Amphitheatre in West Palm Beach, Florida and was scheduled to end on October 24, 2020, at Epic Center Festival in Charlotte, North Carolina. The band utilized a plethora of opening acts, including Bad Company, Kid Rock, and Hank Williams Jr., throughout the tour.

All tour dates between June 2020 and October 2020 were rescheduled to a later date in 2021 due the COVID-19 pandemic. When the tour dates were rescheduled, the band renamed the tour the Big Wheels Keep On Turnin' Tour, hinting that it might not actually be their final tour. On March 5, 2023, guitarist and longest-remaining original member Gary Rossington passed away, making this the final tour with his involvement.

Set list
The following set list was taken from the May 5, 2018, performance in Tampa, Florida and may not be representative of all shows on the tour. 

 "Skynyrd Nation"
 "Workin' For MCA"
 "What's Your Name"
 "Double Trouble"
 "Travelin' Man"
 "That Smell"
 "I Know A Little"
 "Whiskey Rock-A-Roller"
 "Saturday Night Special"
 "The Ballad of Curtis Loew"
 "Tuesday's Gone"
 "Don't Ask Me No Questions"
 "Simple Man"
 "Gimme Three Steps"
 "Call Me the Breeze"
 "Sweet Home Alabama"
Encore 
 "Free Bird"

Tour dates

Cancelled shows

Notes

References

External links 
 Official Lynyrd Skynyrd Website

Lynyrd Skynyrd concert tours
2018 concert tours
2019 concert tours
2020 concert tours
Farewell concert tours
Concert tours postponed due to the COVID-19 pandemic